Gonçalo Oliveira (born 17 February 1995) is a Portuguese tennis player.

Oliveira has a career high ATP singles ranking of 194 achieved on 25 December 2017. He also has a career high doubles ranking of 78 achieved on 9 March 2020.

Oliveira has won 7 ATP Challenger doubles titles.

Challenger and Futures/World Tennis Tour finals

Singles: 15 (8–7)

Doubles: 73 (35–38)

External links
 
 

1995 births
Living people
Portuguese male tennis players
Sportspeople from Porto
21st-century Portuguese people